Hesperis is a genus of flowering plants in the family Brassicaceae. Most are native to Eurasia, with several endemic to Greece & Turkey. Many plants of this genus bear showy, fragrant flowers in shades of purple and white. One of the more widely known species is the common garden flower Hesperis matronalis.
The genus name Hesperis was probably given because the scent of the flowers becomes more conspicuous towards evening (Hespera is the Greek word for evening).

Species include:
Hesperis anatolica
Hesperis armena
Hesperis aspera
Hesperis balansae
Hesperis bicuspidata
Hesperis bottae
Hesperis dinarica
Hesperis kitiana
Hesperis kotschyana
Hesperis hyrcana
Hesperis laciniata
Hesperis matronalis
Hesperis pendula
Hesperis persica
Hesperis pisidica
Hesperis podocarpa
Hesperis rupestris
Hesperis scabrida
Hesperis schischkinii
Hesperis sibirica
Hesperis slovaca
Hesperis trullata
Hesperis turkmendagensis
Hesperis varolii

Classical Literature Sources 
Classical literature source for the plant Hesperis:

Pliny, Natural History 21. 18 ff (trans. Bostock & Riley) (Roman historian C1st AD)

References

External links
Jepson Manual Treatment

Brassicaceae
Brassicaceae genera